Mountain Home is the largest city and county seat of Elmore County, Idaho, United States. The population was 15,979 in the 2020 census. Mountain Home is the principal city of the Mountain Home, Idaho Micropolitan Statistical Area, which includes Elmore County.

Mountain Home was originally a post office at Rattlesnake Station, a stagecoach stop on the Overland Stage Line, about seven miles (11 km) east of the city, on present-day US-20 towards Fairfield. With the addition of the Oregon Short Line Railroad in 1883, the post office was moved downhill and west to the city's present site.

Opened in 1943 during World War II, the base was originally a bomber training base and later an operational Strategic Air Command bomber and missile base (1953–65). It switched to Tactical Air Command and fighters in January 1966, which was succeeded by Air Combat Command in 1992.

Geography

About  to the northwest are the Crater Rings, a National Natural Landmark.

Mountain Home experiences a semi-arid climate (Köppen BSk) with short, cold winters and hot, dry summers.

Highways

  - Interstate 84 bypasses the city, running about a mile east; it links with Boise  to the northwest and Twin Falls  to the southeast.
  - US 20 splits from I-84 at exit 95, heading eastbound toward Fairfield and over to Idaho Falls in eastern Idaho.
   - US 26 and US 30 follow Interstate 84 through the city.
  - SH-51 heads south-southwest towards Bruneau and on to Elko, Nevada, changing to Nevada State Route 225 midway through the Duck Valley Indian Reservation.
  - SH-67 heads west-southwest toward the air base and on to Grand View via SH-167.

Demographics

2020 census
At the 2020 census, there were 15,979 people, 6,081 households with 3.01 persons per household and 3,358 families in the city. There were 6,597 housing units at an average density of. The racial makeup of the city was 75.0% White, 2.6% African American, 1.2% Native American, 3.0% Asian, 0.3% Pacific Islander, 6.6% from other races, and 11.3% from two or more races. Hispanic or Latino people of any race were 15.9% of the population.

There were 6,081 households, of which 29.6% had children under the age of 18 living with them, 49.9% were married couples living together, 10.9% had a female householder with no husband present, 5.3% had a male householder with no wife present, and 44.8% were non-families. 33.6% of all households were made up of individuals, and 9.5% had someone living alone who was 65 years of age or older. The average household size was 2.31 and the average family size was 3.01.

2010 census

At the 2010 census, there were 14,206 people, 5,648 households and 3,686 families living in the city. The racial makeup of the city was 75.0% White, 2.6% African American, 1.2% Native American, 3.0% Asian, 0.6% Pacific Islander, 4.8% from other races, and 4.4% from two or more races. Hispanic or Latino people of any race were 11.9% of the population.

There were 5,648 households, of which 36.9% had children under the age of 18 living with them, 50.0% were married couples living together, 10.9% had a female householder with no husband present, 4.4% had a male householder with no wife present, and 34.7% were non-families. 27.6% of all households were made up of individuals, and 8.1% had someone living alone who was 65 years of age or older. The average household size was 2.49 and the average family size was 3.06.

The median age in the city was 29.8 years. 27.9% of residents were under the age of 18; 12.4% were between the ages of 18 and 24; 29.1% were from 25 to 44; 20.7% were from 45 to 64; and 9.9% were 65 years of age or older. The gender makeup of the city was 51.3% male and 48.7% female.

2000 census
At the 2000 census, there were 11,143 people, 4,337 households and 2,957 families living in the city. The racial makeup of the city was 87.89% White, 2.61% African American, 0.94% Native American, 1.73% Asian, 0.31% Pacific Islander, 3.41% from other races, and 3.11% from two or more races. Hispanic or Latino people of any race were 8.33% of the population.

There were 4,337 households, of which 36.8% had children under the age of 18 living with them, 55.7% were married couples living together, 9.0% had a female householder with no husband present, and 31.8% were non-families. 26.6% of all households were made up of individuals, and 7.4% had someone living alone who was 65 years of age or older.  The average household size was 2.54 and the average family size was 3.11.

29.6% of the population were under the age of 18, 9.8% from 18 to 24, 32.8% from 25 to 44, 18.1% from 45 to 64, and 9.7% who were 65 years of age or older. The median age was 32 years. For every 100 females, there were 101.0 males. For every 100 females age 18 and over, there were 99.5 males.

The median household income was $37,307 and the median family income was $41,485. Males had a median income of $28,724 and females $21,905. The per capita income was $17,029. About 8.6% of families and 10.4% of the population were below the poverty line, including 13.9% of those under age 18 and 11.8% of those age 65 or over.

Notable people
 Korey Hall - NFL player
 Richard McKenna - novelist
 Ford Rainey - actor
 James F. Reilly - former NASA astronaut and geologist
 Victor Wooten - musician

References

Further reading

External links

 
 Mountain Home School District

 
Cities in Idaho
Cities in Elmore County, Idaho
Micropolitan areas of Idaho
County seats in Idaho